Callicera erratica  ( Walker, 1849 ), the Golden Pine Fly , is a rare species of syrphid fly observed in the North Eastern United States and Canada. Hoverflies can remain nearly motionless in flight. The adults are also known as flower flies for they are commonly found on flowers from which they get both energy-giving nectar and protein-rich pollen. Larvae live in water filled rotholes and cavities of old living  conifers .

References

Further reading

External links

 

Eristalinae
Insects described in 1849
Taxa named by Francis Walker (entomologist)